Fitzhugh J. Dodson (October 28, 1923, Baltimore, Maryland – May 2, 1993, Long Beach, California) was an American clinical psychologist, lecturer and educator.  He wrote several popular books including the  best-selling How to Parent.

Biography
Dodson was born in Baltimore, Maryland, United States in 1923. His father also bore the name Fitzhugh J. Dodson (born c. 1886 in Virginia) and his mother was Lillian M. Dodson, née Northam (born c. 1890 in Maryland). He attended high school in Baltimore, living at 704 Wyndhurst Avenue with his parents, younger sister and maternal grandparents. He went on to graduate cum laude with a bachelor's degree from Johns Hopkins University in 1944, then gained his Bachelor of Divinity degree magna cum laude from Yale University in 1948 and his PhD was conferred by the University of Southern California in 1957. He went on to become a member of over ten scholarly associations.

During his student years he was editor of a newspaper, president of the freshman class, senior member of the student council, business manager of the debating council and a member of Beta Theta Pi, Phi Beta Kappa, Pi Delta Epsilon and Omicron Delta Kappa. He had summer pastorates in Tennessee, West Virginia and southern Oregon.

He was ordained as a Presbyterian minister in 1948, and on November 6, 1949 he was installed as pastor of the Palatine Hill Presbyterian Church in Portland, Oregon and he also taught religion at the nearby Lewis and Clark College., then from 1957 to 1958 he was director of counseling centers in Portland and Los Angeles.

He married Grace Goheen, a preschool director, on August 1, 1958, and in 1959 he joined the staff of El Camino College in Torrance, California, to teach philosophy; then from 1962 taught in the Psychology Department of California State University, Long Beach. He also taught at UCLA Extension.

He was senior psychological consultant to Project Head Start in Long Beach Unified School District.

He founded the internationally famous La Primera pre-school in Walteria, Torrance, California. Building started in May 1963; the school was designed for children aged three to five and also for the training of pre-school teachers; his wife became director of the school and Dodson himself had the role of consultant.

He went on to work as a clinical psychologist in private practice in Redondo Beach for more than 25 years, treating children, adolescents and adults by both individual and group psychotherapy and also educating parents and undertaking marriage counselling. He wrote a number of books, including the best-selling How to parent and How to father, both of which were translated into a number of languages. He married his second wife, Cecelia Kovacs, on January 26, 1974.

Dodson died of heart failure at the age of 69 on May 2, 1993 at the Alamitos Belmont Rehabilitation Hospital in Long Beach, California. His survivors included three children from his first marriage, Robin Ellyn, Randall James and Rustin Fitzhugh.

Teachings
Dodson taught that children need both love and discipline, and this was seen as a contradiction to the permissive approach attributed to Dr. Benjamin Spock. He stated, "Many parents also have the impression that modern psychology teaches that you should not spank children. Some psychologists and psychiatrists have actually stated this idea in print. However, as a psychologist, I believe it is impossible to raise children effectively—particularly aggressive, forceful boys—without spanking them."

He continued, "This does not mean that any kind of spanking is all right for a child. I want to make it clear that there is a "right" kind of spanking and a "wrong" kind. By the wrong kind I mean a cruel and sadistic beating. This fills a child with hatred, and a deep desire for revenge. This is the kind that is administered with a strap or stick or some other type of parental "weapon." Or it could also mean a humiliating slap in the face. The right kind of spanking needs no special paraphernalia. Just the hand of the parent administered a few times on the kid's bottom. The right kind of spanking is a positive thing. It clears the air, and is vastly preferable to moralistic and guilt-inducing parental lectures."

Alongside this teaching, he strongly emphasised the importance of a strong, loving family structure, and favoured three-generation extended families; he taught that society should train people in parenting and grandparenting skills, suggesting that parenting should be taught in high schools, and that evening classes should also be available.

Publications
His published works include:

Books
 (also translated into German, French, Dutch, Hebrew, Spanish, Portuguese, Japanese, Arabic, Chinese, Korean, Thai and Turkish)
 (also translated into Turkish, French, Japanese, Korean, Vietnamese, Persian, Italian and German)

Other works
 (PhD thesis)

Memberships
Dodson's memberships included:
 American Psychological Association
 American Group Therapy Association
 American Anthropological Association
 American Sociological Association
 American Association for the Advancement of Science
 Academy of Religion and Mental Health
 Society for the Study of Religion
 Western Psychological Association
 California Psychological Association
 Los Angeles Psychological Association
 Los Angeles Society of Clinical Psychologists
 Phi Beta Kappa

References

20th-century American psychologists
American Presbyterian ministers
California State University, Long Beach faculty
El Camino College faculty
Lewis & Clark College faculty
University of Southern California alumni
Yale University alumni
Johns Hopkins University alumni
People from Baltimore
1923 births
1993 deaths
Writers from Portland, Oregon
20th-century American clergy
American clinical psychologists